HP Z is a series of professional workstation computers developed by HP. The first-generation desktop products were announced in March 2009, replacing HP's xw-series workstations. The product line expanded to mobile with the announcement of Z Book in September 2013, replacing HP's EliteBook W-series mobile workstations.  The Z workstations mainly compete against Dell Precision workstations, Lenovo's ThinkStation or ThinkPad P-series workstations, as well as the Apple Mac Pro and MacBook Pro.

Desktop workstations

First generation

The HP Z800, HP Z600 and HP Z400 were announced in March 2009, offering Intel Nehalem Xeon processors and a new chassis design. An entry-level model, HP Z200, was announced in January 2010 at CES 2010.  A small-form-factor version of the Z200, along with Intel Westmere Xeon processor refresh, were introduced to the lineup in March 2010. Z210, the successor of Z200, was announced in April 2011 with Intel Sandy Bridge Xeon E3 processors. An all-in-one workstation Z1 featuring Sandy Bridge E3 processors was introduced in February 2012.

Second generation

The second-generation workstations Z820, Z620 and Z420 were announced in March 2012, featuring Intel Sandy Bridge-E Xeon E5 processors. The entry-level Z220 was refreshed with Intel Ivy Bridge Xeon E3 v2 processors in June 2012.  Z230, successor to Z220, was introduced in July 2013 with Intel Haswell Xeon E3 v3 processors. Z820, Z620 and Z420 were updated to Intel Ivy Bridge Xeon E5 v2 processors in September 2013. The second-generation Z1 G2 all-in-one was announced at CES 2014.

Third generation

The third-generation workstations Z840, Z640 and Z440 were announced in September 2014, featuring Intel Haswell Xeon E5 v3 processors. The processors were later updated to Broadwell in April 2016.  The entry-level Z240 was announced in September 2015 with Intel Skylake E3 v5 processors, and later updated to Kaby Lake Xeon E3 v6 processors. The third-generation all-in-one Z1 G3 was announced in April 2016 with Intel Skylake processors. A mini workstation, Z2 Mini G3, was announced in November 2016.

Fourth generation
The fourth-generation workstations Z8 G4, Z6 G4 and Z4 G4 were announced in September 2017, shipping with Intel Skylake Xeon Scalable or W-series processors. Cascade Lake processors were made available in April 2019. Entry-level Z2 G4 and Z2 Mini G4 were announced in July 2018, featuring Intel Coffee Lake Xeon E-series processors.

Mobile workstations

See also 

 Dell Precision
 Lenovo ThinkStation
 Fujitsu Celsius
 Mac Pro
 List of Hewlett-Packard products

References 

Products introduced in 2009
Hewlett-Packard computers
Computer workstations